Diabolique is a Swedish gothic metal band formed in 1995 after the dissolution of Liers in Wait. The group is heavily influenced by The Sisters of Mercy, Black Sabbath, and Fields of the Nephilim, and in sound are similar to the styles of Charon, Tiamat, Moonspell, and Type O Negative.

The band's current and former line-up has consisted of many musicians from progenital Gothenburg melodic death metal bands; Kristian Wåhlin, Johan Osterberg, and Alf Svensson were in Grotesque (a predecessor of At the Gates, who Alf would eventually join); and Daniel Svensson briefly played drums with the group before going on to major success with In Flames.

The band's most recent release was The Green Goddess (2001). Various sources differ as to band's status. However, Hans Nilsson's full-time involvement with Dimension Zero and Wåhlin's extensive contributions as an album cover artist and musician for other Scandinavian-area extreme metal bands may be attributable to the long period of no activity. In its official website, though, it is stated that:
"After the mixing of "The Green Goddess" was done in November of 1999 the band immediately started writing new songs. Due to the huge amount of material being written the band decided the right thing would be to record two albums. In June 2000 the band hit the studio again to record 22 songs. This project dragged for some time and after a couple of weeks of recording during the summer and autumn of 2000 the rest of the work was postponed to 2001. Even though a rough mix was made in September 2001 the recording was never properly finished. This was what effectively killed the band at this point and led to a break on an indefinite basis."

Band members 
Kristian Wåhlin – vocals, guitar
Johan Osterberg – guitar
Bino Carlsson – bass
Hans Nilsson – drums

Former members 
Alf Svensson – bass
Daniel Svensson – drums

Discography 
The Diabolique (1996)
Wedding the Grotesque (1997)
The Black Flower (1999)
Butterflies (2000)
The Green Goddess (2001)

External links 
Official website (archived)
Black Sun Records Page with biography, discography, and samples
Tartarean Desire biography

Swedish gothic rock groups
Swedish gothic metal musical groups
Musical groups established in 1995
Listenable Records artists